The 2017 Men's Indoor Hockey Asia Cup was the 7th edition of the Indoor Hockey Asia Cup specifically for men. It was held in Doha, Qatar from 24–28 April 2017.

The number of teams for this year’s cup has increased by three compared to the previous edition tournament where five teams competed. Tajikistan, who competed previously, did not join this year’s edition and were replaced by Malaysia, Oman and Thailand.

Iran defeated Kazakhstan in the final to win the cup and secured a place in 2018 Men's Indoor Hockey World Cup.

Participating nations
Eight countries are participating in this year's tournament:

Umpires

 Adam Barry (AUS)
 Andres Ortiz (ESP)
 Hassan Abazari (IRI)
 Ahmed Al Hassani (OMA)
 Abdou Mostafa Mahmoud (QAT)
 Ahmed Rahzani (IRI)
 Sen Xu (CHN)
 Narongtuch Subboonsong (THA)
 Makhsudbek Urmanov (KAZ)
 Mohd Zainal (MAS)

Results
All times are in Qatar Standard Time (UTC+03:00).

First round

Pool A

Pool B

Second round

Bracket
Semi-finals

5–8th place bracket

Fifth to eighth place classification

Crossover

Seventh and eighth place

Fifth and sixth place

First to fourth place classification

Semifinals

Third and fourth place

Final

Final standings

References

External links
Official website

Indoor Hockey Asia Cup Men
Indoor Hockey Asia Cup
Asia Cup
International field hockey competitions hosted by Qatar
Indoor Hockey Asia Cup Men
Sports competitions in Doha
21st century in Doha